The céntimo (in Spanish-speaking countries) or cêntimo (in Portuguese-speaking countries) was a currency unit of Spain, Portugal and their former colonies. The word derived from the Latin   meaning "hundredth part". The main Spanish currency, before the euro, was the peseta which was divided into 100 céntimos. In Portugal it was the real and later the escudo, until it was also replaced by the euro. In the European community cent is the official name for one hundredth of a euro.  However, both céntimo (in Spanish) and cêntimo (in Portuguese) are commonly used to describe the euro cent.

Current use
Céntimo or cêntimo is one-hundredth of the following basic monetary units:

Portuguese cêntimo
 Angolan kwanza
 São Tomé and Príncipe dobra
 Euro cent

Spanish céntimo
 Costa Rican colón (but as centavo between 1917 and 1920)
 Paraguayan guaraní
 Peruvian sol
 Philippine peso (as séntimo in Filipino, as centavo in English)
 Venezuelan bolívar
 Euro cent

Obsolete

Portuguese cêntimo
 Mozambican metica (never issued)

Spanish céntimo
 Sahrawi peseta
 Spanish peseta

References

Coins of Spain